Sprinkange is a small town in the commune of Dippach, in south-western Luxembourg.  , the town has a population of 354.

Dippach
Towns in Luxembourg